The buff-spotted flufftail (Sarothrura elegans) is a species of bird in the family Sarothruridae.
It is found in Angola, Botswana, Burundi, Cameroon, Republic of the Congo, Democratic Republic of the Congo, Ivory Coast, Equatorial Guinea, Eswatini, Ethiopia, Gabon, Guinea, Kenya, Liberia, Malawi, Mozambique, Nigeria, Rwanda, Sierra Leone, Somalia, South Africa, South Sudan, Tanzania, Uganda, Zambia, and Zimbabwe.

References

External links
Image at ADW 
Species text in The Atlas of Southern African Birds
 Sarothrura elegans at avibase.bsc-eoc.org

Sarothrura
Birds of Sub-Saharan Africa
Birds described in 1839
Taxonomy articles created by Polbot